Attorney General Taylor may refer to:

James Craig Taylor (1826–1887), Attorney General of Virginia
William S. Taylor (Kentucky politician) (1853–1928), Attorney General of Kentucky

See also
General Taylor (disambiguation)